Kettévált mennyezet  is a Hungarian film directed by Pál Gábor which was released in 1982. The script was written by Endre Vészi and had the following starring actors: Juli Básti, Jan Nowicki and Gyula Szersén.

References

1981 films
Hungarian drama films
1980s Hungarian-language films
Films directed by Pál Gábor